Calocedrus decurrens, with the common names incense cedar and  California incense cedar (syn. Libocedrus decurrens Torr.), is a species of coniferous tree native to western North America. It is the most widely known species in the genus, and is often simply called incense cedar without the regional qualifier.

Description
Specimens form a broad conic crown of spreading branches. The bark is orange-brown weathering grayish, smooth at first, becoming fissured and exfoliating in long strips on the lower trunk on old trees. Specimens can live to over 500 years old.

The leaves are bright green on both sides of the shoots, with only inconspicuous stomata. The foliage, when crushed, gives off an aroma somewhat akin to shoe-polish.

The cones turn orange to yellow-brown when mature about 8 months after pollination.

Distribution
The bulk of the tree's range is in the United States, from central-southwestern Oregon through most of California and the extreme west of Nevada, as well as a short distance into northwest Mexico in northern Baja California.

Ecology
At lower elevations, associated trees include oaks and ponderosa pine. Giant sequoia bears similarities to the species, but has sharp leaves. In the south–southwest U.S. some have confused bushy junipers for incense cedar.

With its thick basal bark, the incense cedar is one of the most fire- and drought-tolerant plants in California. Although the tree is killed by hot, stand-replacing crown fire, it spreads rapidly after lower-intensity burns. This has given the incense cedar a competitive advantage over other species such as the bigcone Douglas-fir in recent years. Incense cedar is more shade tolerant than Douglas-fir, but not as much so as grand or white fir. It grows slowly when needed to outlast competition.

This tree is the preferred host of a wood wasp, Syntexis libocedrii a species which lays its eggs in the smoldering wood immediately after a forest fire. The tree is also host to incense-cedar mistletoe (Phoradendron libocedri), a parasitic plant which can often be found hanging from its branches. Fire scars provide an entry point for Tyromyces amarus (pocket dry rot). Gymnosporangium rust disease afflicts the trees, but is rarely fatal.

For numerous birds during the wintertime, Calocedrus decurrens has been seen to be used for foraging. According to the United States Department of Agriculture, in areas of the Western Sierra Nevada in California, numerous species of birds are thought to use the incense cedar as a "foraging substrate" so that they can attain as much food as needed. Human impacts on these trees due to forest management practices have caused issues for many of these birds, threatening the use of the incense cedar as a forage substrate.

Uses
The wood is soft and light, and has a pleasant odor and is generally resistant to rot. It has been used for external house siding, interior paneling, and to make moth-resistant hope chests. It was once the primary material for wooden pencils, because it is soft and tends to sharpen easily without forming splinters.

Native Americans
Indigenous peoples of California use the plant in traditional medicine, basket making, hunting bows, building materials, and to produce fire by friction. A Northern California tribe used branchlets to filter out sand from water when leaching toxins from acorn meal; foliage also served as a flavoring.

The Maidu Concow tribe name for the plant is hö'-tä (Konkow language).

Cultivation
Calocedrus decurrens is cultivated as an ornamental tree, for planting in gardens and parks. It is used in traditional, xeriscapic, native plant, and wildlife gardens; and also in designed natural landscaping and habitat restoration projects in California. It is valued for its columnar form and evergreen foliage textures.

The tree is also grown in gardens and parks in cool summer climates, including the Pacific Northwest in the Northwestern United States and British Columbia, eastern Great Britain and continental Northern Europe. In these areas it can develop an especially narrow columnar crown, an unexplained consequence of the cooler climatic conditions that is rare in trees within its warm summer natural range in the California Floristic Province. Other cultivated species from the family Cupressaceae can have similar crown forms.

Award of Garden Merit
This plant has gained the Royal Horticultural Society's Award of Garden Merit, and has the cultivar 'Berrima Gold'.

Essential oils
Various species in the family Cupressaceae can be utilized for the creation of essential oils. Scientific studies have shown that these essential oils have "strong antimicrobial properties." Antimicrobial properties are those properties of a substance that lower the levels of microbes, such as bacteria and viruses. These antimicrobial properties could potentially be used for therapies in developing countries, although more testing and clinical trials should be done before such measures are implemented.

See also
 Cedar wood
 List of California native plants

Gallery

References

External links

 
 
 

decurrens
Least concern plants
Trees of Baja California
Trees of the Northwestern United States
Trees of the Southwestern United States
Flora of California
Flora of Oregon
Flora of the Cascade Range
Flora of the Klamath Mountains
Flora of the Sierra Nevada (United States)
Natural history of the California Coast Ranges
Natural history of the Peninsular Ranges
Natural history of the Transverse Ranges
Plants used in traditional Native American medicine
Least concern flora of North America
Least concern flora of the United States